CUJ may refer to:

Education 
 Central University of Jharkhand
 Capital University, Jharkhand

Other
 Consumers Union of Japan
 Critical User Journey, a concept in software user experience design

See also
  Cuvio, a comune in Italy called Cüj in Western Lombard